Greigsville is a hamlet and census-designated place (CDP) in the town of York, Livingston County, New York, United States. Its population was 209 as of the 2010 census. The community is located at the intersection of New York State Route 36 and New York State Route 63.

Geography
Greigsville is in northwestern Livingston County, in the southern part of the town of York. State Route 36 leads north  to York hamlet and south  to Leicester, while SR 63 leads southeast  to Geneseo, the Livingston county seat, and northwest  to Batavia.

The northeast border of the CDP follows Bidwells Creek, an eastward-flowing tributary of the Genesee River.

Demographics

References

Hamlets in Livingston County, New York
Hamlets in New York (state)
Census-designated places in Livingston County, New York
Census-designated places in New York (state)